Christoff Swanepoel is a South African rugby league player for the Bloemfontein Roosters. His position is fullback. He is a South African international, and has played in the 2013 Rugby League World Cup qualifying against Jamaica and the USA

References

South African rugby league players
South Africa national rugby league team players
Rugby league fullbacks
Bloemfontein Roosters players
Living people
Year of birth missing (living people)